Parliamentary elections were held in Bulgaria on 26 March 2017. They had originally been scheduled for 2018 at the end of the four-year term of the National Assembly. However, following the resignation of Prime Minister Boyko Borisov and the failure of Bulgarian parties to form a government, early elections were called. Borisov resigned following the defeat of Tsetska Tsacheva, the candidate of his GERB party, in the November 2016 presidential elections. The official election campaign began on 24 February.

GERB won a plurality, with 95 of the 240 seats. Borisov was elected Prime Minister again after negotiating a governing coalition.

Background
During the 2016 presidential election campaign, Borisov promised to resign if his party's candidate, Chairperson of the National Assembly Tsetska Tsacheva, lost the election.

On 6 November 2016 Tsacheva finished second in the first round to BSP-backed Major General Rumen Radev, receiving only 22% of the popular vote compared to Radev's 25.4%. Following the result, Borisov reiterated his promise to resign if his party's candidate lost the runoff election a week later. On November 13, 2016, she finished a distant second with only 36.2% of the popular vote compared to Radev's 59.4%.

Borisov, staying true to his campaign promise, subsequently resigned on 14 November. Two days later, the National Assembly voted 218–0 to accept it.

Electoral system
The 240 members of the National Assembly are elected by closed list proportional representation from 31 multi-member constituencies ranging in size from 4 to 16 seats. The electoral threshold is 4%.

Bulgarians abroad were able to vote in 371 voting sections in 70 foreign countries and territories. Some territories were excluded from this provision due to either security concerns (e.g. Afghanistan, Iraq, Libya and Syria) or that very few resident Bulgarian nationals resident in the country had submitted requests to be enabled to vote (e.g. Ethiopia, Indonesia, Mongolia, North Korea and Pakistan).

Participating parties
The deadline for political parties to register for the election was 8 February 2017. Despite holding 15 seats in the Assembly, Reload Bulgaria chose not to compete in the election after being initially refused a name change, among other reasons. The list of registered parties is below.

Opinion polls

Percentages do not account for undecided voters. 'Date' column signifies the last date of the survey in question, not the date of publication.

 Combined result of the Patriotic Front and Attack.

Results

Five parties crossed the 4% threshold required to gain seats. GERB maintained their position as the largest party.

Voter demographics
Gallup exit polling suggested the following demographic breakdown.

Aftermath and government formation
Boyko Borisov appeared set to resume his tenure as Prime Minister, possibly with a coalition with the United Patriots, and ultimately formed the Third Borisov Government with the United Patriots.

References

Bulgaria
Parliamentary
March 2017 events in Europe
Parliamentary elections in Bulgaria